Martin Klabník (born 22 November 1991) is a Slovak football defender who last played for Slovak side Pohronie.

Career

Club career
He came to Spartak Trnava in January 2013. 

On 5 July 2017 he came to Polish team Radomiak Radom. He played for the club until January 2020, when he moved to Chojniczanka Chojnice. In July 2021, Klabník moved to GKS Bełchatów.

External links
Corgoň Liga profile

References

1991 births
Living people
People from Ilava
Sportspeople from the Trenčín Region
Slovak footballers
Slovak expatriate footballers
Association football central defenders
FK Dubnica players
FC Spartak Trnava players
FC DAC 1904 Dunajská Streda players
FK Iskra Borčice players
TJ OFC Gabčíkovo players
FK Frýdek-Místek players
Radomiak Radom players
Chojniczanka Chojnice players
GKS Bełchatów players
FK Pohronie players
Slovak Super Liga players
2. Liga (Slovakia) players
Czech National Football League players
II liga players
I liga players
Expatriate footballers in the Czech Republic
Expatriate footballers in Poland
Slovak expatriate sportspeople in Poland
Slovak expatriate sportspeople in the Czech Republic